Khurda (Sl. No.: 117) is a Vidhan Sabha constituency of Khordha district, Odisha, India.

This constituency includes Khordha, Khurda block and 8 Gram panchayats (Palatotapada, Bajapur, Nijigarhtapanga, Kanpur, Dhaulimuhan, Brajamohanpur, Naranagarh, Godipada, Jankia, Golabaisasan, Orabarasingh, Kuradhamalla, Bangida and Kaipadar) of Khurda block.

Elected members

Sixteen elections were held between 1951 and 2014 including one By election in 1998.
Elected members from the Khurda constituency are:
2019: (117): Jyotirindra Nath Mitra (BJD)
2014: (117): Rajendra Kumar Sahoo (BJD)
2009: (117): Rajendra Kumar Sahoo (Independent) 
2004: (59): Jyotirindra Nath Mitra (BJD)
2000: (59): Jyotirindra Nath Mitra (Independent) 
1998: (By Poll): Dillip Srichandan (Congress)
1995: (59): Prasanna Kumar Patasani (Janata Dal)
1990: (59): Prasanna Kumar Patsani (Janata Dal)
1985: (59): Janaki Ballabh Patnaik (Congress)
1980: (59): Prasanna Kumar Patsani (Congress-I)
1977: (59): Sudarsan Mohanty (Janata Party)
1974: (59): Benudhar Baliarsingh (Congress)
1971: (55): Benudhar Baliarsingh (JAC)
1967: (55): Raja Birakishore Dev (JAC)
1961: (87): Banamali Patnaik (Congress)
1957: (60): Prananath Pattnaik (CPI)
1951: (90): Madhab Chandra Routray (Congress)

2019 Election result

2014 Election result
In 2014 election, Biju Janata Dal candidate Rajendra Kumar Sahoo defeated Bhartiya Janata Party candidate Jyotindranath Mitra by a margin of 6,592 votes.

2009 Election result
In 2009 election, Independent candidate Rajendra Kumar Sahoo  defeated Independent candidate Jyotirindra Nath Mitra by a margin of 3,235 votes.

Notes

References

Assembly constituencies of Odisha
Khordha district